Ralph C. Smedley (February 22, 1878 – September 11, 1965) was the founder of Toastmasters International, an international speaking organization with more than 352,000 members in 141 countries and more than 16,400 individual clubs.

Illinois Wesleyan University recognized Smedley's service to mankind by conferring him the honorary degree of Doctor of Humane Letters (L.H.D.) in 1950. Santa Ana named a junior high school after him in 1955.

Personal life 
Smedley was born in Waverly, Illinois, a city twenty miles southwest of Springfield. He remained in Illinois most of his youth. After high school, he taught at schools in the countryside before enrolling at Illinois Wesleyan University at Bloomington, Illinois. After his graduation in 1903, he started working at the local YMCA. 

The father of Toastmasters, Ralph C. Smedley, was known to be a modest and quiet person. A tireless worker with a passion for helping others to realize their full potential himself, he was far from flashy or flamboyant.

He had always been determined to make Toastmasters, his brainchild, a success.

Toastmasters 
In 1903, at YMCA, he saw the need of interpersonal skills pertaining to communication, management and leadership in the community. In order to aid people to learn how to speak, conduct meetings, plan programs and work on committees, he started the speaking club - The Toastmasters Club on March 24, 1905. It would later be known as the first unofficial Toastmasters club. Laying the foundational methodologies which are followed in the Toastmasters meeting even today, the members took turns speaking and taking part in leadership in every meeting. Smedley and other more experienced men evaluated the short speeches given by younger men willing to improve. However, he had to eventually relocate to Freeport and the lack of proper leadership and direction at the time did not allow the nascent club to grow.

In Freeport, he tried again. This time he was trying to encourage local businessmen to sign up and improve their speaking ability. However, the idea never caught on - until he moved to California to take a job at the YMCA in Santa Ana, California. On October 22, 1924, he organized the first official club in the newly built YMCA building that eventually became Club No. 1 of Toastmasters International. The word about the club spread quickly and people in neighbouring communities and other states started asking Smedley how they could start their own club. Smedley decided to write the "Manual of Instructions" and "Ten Lessons in Public Speaking," in order to save time from writing redundant letters and replying to queries and inquiries about the same, he printed the guidelines and bound them in paper covers. On October 25, 1928, he secured copyrights on the publications and trademarked the name "Toastmasters Club." He based the name on the popular word: "toastmaster" which refers to the person who gives toasts at events, gatherings and occasions.

By 1930, close to 30 Toastmasters clubs had started including a club in British Columbia, Canada. In order to garner traction and secure expansion outside of the United States, the newly formed organization was renamed to Toastmasters International. A couple of years later, in 1932, Toastmasters International was incorporated as a Californian non-profit organization and Smedley took multiple positions such as that of Secretary and Editor in the new association.

Smedley kept his day job at the YMCA but spent his evenings writing articles about the art of speaking. Some of that literature is still used by Toastmasters today. His theory about good speaking, simply put, is that a person should address a group just as he or she would one person.

As examples of great orators, he held up President Franklin D. Roosevelt and humorist Will Rogers. He pointed out to colleagues that both men's highly acclaimed radio talks succeeded because each listener felt as if he or she was an audience of one.

Over the years, Toastmasters continued to grow. In 1941, the organization was large enough to hire Smedley as its leader full-time. He gave up his job as general secretary of the Santa Ana YMCA and rented a 12-by-16-foot office in downtown Santa Ana. From there, he handled the organization's growing correspondence and distributed educational materials to clubs that were springing up across the nation and around the world.

As the group's educational director, he wrote the two manuals--"Basic Training” and “Beyond Basic Training"—that Toastmasters still use. He also edited the organization's magazine, The Toastmaster, and wrote many of its articles.

Smedley was honored by Toastmasters International in 1956 at a national convention where he was elected president and board member for life. He continued to work for the organization as educational director and lived in Orange Country until his death in 1965 at 87.

Works
The man behind the rules: An account of the life and work of Henry Martyn Robert, author of Robert's Rules of order (1937)
The Amateur Chairman (1939, ?, ?, 1947)
Speech Evaluation: The Art of Constructive Criticism (1940)
The Voice of the Speaker (1949, ?, 1967)
Speech Engineering: 25 Ways to Build a Speech (1952)
The Amateur Chairman (Toastmasters International) (1952)
The Great Peacemaker (1955)
Basic Training for Toastmasters (1956)
The Story of Toastmasters: Reminiscences of the Founder (1959)
Beyond Basic Training (1961)
The Advanced Speaker (1963)
Personally Speaking: Selections from the Writings of Ralph C. Smedley (1966)

References

External links

 

1878 births
1965 deaths
Burials at Pacific View Memorial Park
Illinois Wesleyan University alumni
People from Morgan County, Illinois
Writers from Illinois
YMCA leaders
Toastmasters International